Miodrag Grbić, (25 December 1901 – 30 June 1969 in Belgrade) was a Serbian archeologist and custos. He studied in Prague, where he gained a Ph.D. in archeology. He published the Archaeologia Iugoslavica journal together with Nikola Vulić. Most of his works are about neoliths in Balkan.

References
Grbić, Mihailo in Enciklopedija srpske istoriografije, Beograd 1997

20th-century Serbian people
Serbian archaeologists
1901 births
1969 deaths
Yugoslav archaeologists
20th-century archaeologists